Ratu Emosi Vucago (born May 10, 1983) is a Fiji Rugby union player. He plays as a half-back in the Fifteens man-code and also as a halfback/fly-half in the Sevens code He has also been part Fiji Sevens team since  the Wellington leg in 2007. He is a  cousin of  Fiji national Fly Half, Seremaia Bai

In the Fifteens version of the game, he plays as a half-back and has represented Nadroga several times in the Digicel Cup and he also plays for the Coastal Stallions in the Colonial Cup as well as being part of their 2006 winning team. He made his fifteens debut against Tonga in Gosford Park, Australia in June 2006 where they lost by a point. Emosi is currently the vice captain for Fiji in the 2011/12 HSBC Series.

Career highlights
Fiji Sevens 2007–present
Coastal Stallions 2006–present
Nadroga – 2007–present

References
 Fiji Rugby website
 Teivovo website

External links 
 

1983 births
Living people
People from Rewa Province
Fijian rugby union players
Rugby union scrum-halves
Male rugby sevens players
Fiji international rugby union players
Fijian expatriate rugby union players
Expatriate rugby union players in the United States
Fijian expatriate sportspeople in the United States
Fiji international rugby sevens players
I-Taukei Fijian people